John Francis Kieran (August 2, 1892 – December 10, 1981) was an American author, journalist, amateur naturalist and radio and television personality.

Early years
A native of The Bronx, Kieran was the son of Dr. James M. Kieran and his wife, Katherine Donahue Kieran. Both of his parents were teachers, and his father was at one time president of Hunter College. He had three sisters and three brothers.

Kieran earned a Bachelor of Science degree (cum laude) from Fordham University. After graduating, he became a poultry farmer and taught school.

Career
Kieran began his newspaper career in 1915 as a sportswriter for The New York Times. He continued on the sports beat during his entire career, working for a number of New York City newspapers and becoming one of the country's best known sports columnists. On January 4, 1943, his column moved to the New York Sun. During his 1927–1943 tenure as The Times''' senior sports columnist, he was profiled in the January 9, 1939, issue of Time magazine, which described him as "short, wiry, grey, bristly and brilliant".

Although Kieran is widely credited with first applying the term "grand slam" to tennis, to describe the winning of all four major tennis tournaments in a calendar year, sports columnist Alan Gould had used the term in that connection almost two months before Kieran.

A noted "intellectual", he gained extensive personal popularity with his 10-year stint as a panelist on NBC's most widely heard radio quiz program Information, Please! (May 17, 1938 – June 25, 1948). His seemingly encyclopedic erudition and quick wit, combined with an aura of gentle modesty, endeared him to the listening audience and assured his place on the show. Along with fellow "intellectuals" Franklin P. Adams and host Clifton Fadiman, Kieran entertained and educated radio audiences through the Great Depression, World War II and the Cold War.
 
Within eight months of Information, Please! leaving the air, Kieran entered the new medium of television with TV's first widely syndicated show John Kieran's Kaleidoscope. A 15-minute program produced from February 1949 to April 1952, John Kieran's Kaleidoscope presented its writer and host in his well-acquainted role as the learned and witty guide to the complexities of human knowledge. The 104 episodes touched on any and every subject  from the mating habits of insects to the properties of magnetic attraction to the theories surrounding the creation of the Solar System.

Kieran became a familiar face on 1950s television, guesting on numerous panel and quiz shows, including CBS' 13-week revival of Information, Please! as a 1952 summer replacement show, the only time it would be seen on TV.

A dedicated bird watcher and observer of the natural world, endowed with a breezy, colloquial writing style, Kieran enjoyed roaming Riverdale, his home area of the northwest Bronx, recording for posterity the changing scene at a time when the post-World War II housing boom was encroaching on, and eventually eliminating, formerly natural areas. His 1959 book A Natural History of New York City has continued to be read for its observations on local geography as well as birds, reptiles, fish "in troubled waters" and mammals within the city limits.

In 1964, at the age of 73, Kieran published his autobiography, Not Under Oath.

Personal life
Kieran married Margaret Ford, a feature writer, September 15, 1947, in Brookline, Massachusetts. She was his second wife, his first wife having died five years earlier. A son, John Kieran Jr. (1921–2000), also appeared on 1950s TV, including a stint as a regular panelist in 1955 on another long-running quiz show, Down You Go. Kieran died on December 10, 1981, in Rockport, Massachusetts, at the age of 89 and is buried at Beech Grove Cemetery in Rockport.

Recognition
Kieran was inducted in the National Sportscasters and Sportswriters Association Hall of Fame in 1971. In 1973, Kieran was honored by the Baseball Writers' Association of America with the J. G. Taylor Spink Award for distinguished baseball writing. Recipients of the Spink Award are recognized at the National Baseball Hall of Fame and Museum in what is commonly referred to as the "writers wing" of the Hall of Fame. In 1987, six years after his death, the New York City Parks Department inaugurated The John Kieran Nature Trail, which runs along some of the most scenic areas of the Bronx's Van Cortlandt Park. The trail is part of the former Putnam Division of the New York Central Railroad.

BooksThe Story of the Olympic GamesThe American Sporting SceneFootnotes on NatureNature NotesJohn James Audubon, co-authored with his wife Margaret KieranAn Introduction to Nature (1946), Garden City, New York: Doubleday & Company, Inc. (Revised editions: 1948, 1950, 1952, 1954, 1955, 1966)An Introduction to Wildflowers (1965), Garden City, New York: Doubleday & Company, Inc.An Introduction to Trees (1954), Garden City, New York: Doubleday & Company, Inc.A Natural History of New York City (1959)Not Under Oath (1964), Boston: Houghton Mifflin Co., his autobiographyPoems I Remember: An Anthology of My Favorite Poems (1942), Garden City, New York: Doubleday & Company, Inc.An Introduction to Birds (1946, 1950), Garden City, New York: Doubleday & Company, Inc.

Sources
Kieran, John (1964). Not Under Oath''. Boston: Houghton Mifflin Co.
Zerby, Jack. "John F. Kieran," SABR Baseball Biography Project. SABR.org.

References

External links 
 
 Links to John Kieran-narrated documentaries at Archive.org
 Baseball Hall of Fame profile
 New York City Parks Department's description of the John Kieran Nature Trail
 

1892 births
1981 deaths
Television personalities from New York City
American naturalists
John Burroughs Medal recipients
BBWAA Career Excellence Award recipients
20th-century American non-fiction writers
Journalists from New York City
20th-century American male writers
American male non-fiction writers
Sportswriters from New York (state)
Scientists from the Bronx
20th-century naturalists